Anderson High School can refer to any of the following.

Malaysia 
Anderson National Secondary School, Ipoh, Perak

In the United Kingdom 
Anderson High School, Lerwick

In the United States 

Anderson Union High School, Anderson, California
Boyd H. Anderson High School, Lauderdale Lakes, Florida
Douglas Anderson School of the Arts, Jacksonville, Florida
Anderson High School (Indiana), Anderson, Indiana
Anderson County High School (Kansas), Garnett, Kansas
Anderson County High School (Kentucky), Lawrenceburg, Kentucky
Southgate Anderson High School, Southgate, Michigan
Anderson High School (Ohio), Cincinnati, Ohio
David Anderson High School, Lisbon, Ohio
Anderson County High School (Tennessee), Clinton, Tennessee
Anderson High School (Texas), Austin, Texas